Osaka Municipal Transportation Bureau (大阪市交通局, Ōsaka-shi Kōtsū-kyoku) was the public department of transportation of the city of Osaka, Japan that existed from 1903 to 2018. It operated the municipal subway lines, the New Tram, and the city buses that have replaced the remaining lines of the municipal tram network.

On April 1, 2018, the bureau was split into two private companies: Osaka Rapid Electric Tramway K.K. (known as Osaka Metro) and Osaka City Bus.

Services provided
Municipal trams: 1903–1969
City trolleybuses: 1953–1970
Municipal subway: 1933–2018 (8 lines; Surutto KANSAI Cards and IC cards (PiTaPa and ICOCA) accepted)
New Tram: 1981–2018
City buses: 1927–2018 (103 regular bus routes, 29 red bus routes)

Tickets
 (800 yen (600 yen on weekends, Japan's national holidays, obon, year-end and new year holidays) for adults, 300 yen for children) - Available on the printed date on subways, the New Tram and city buses.
Multiple Ride Card (3,000 yen for adults, 1,500 yen for children) - Usage amounts are 3300 yen, the increase of 10%, and 1650 yen, respectively. When the balance changes to less than 200 yen, it can use up by putting this card and cash into a ticket vending machine, and purchasing a one-way ticket.
Rainbow Card (500 yen, 1,000 yen, 2,000 yen, and 3,000 yen for adults, 500 yen and 1,000 yen for children) - Available on the rail lines and buses belonging to Surutto KANSAI. When the balance changes to less than 200 yen, it can use up by putting this card and cash into a ticket vending machine, and purchasing a one-way ticket.

References

External links

Official website of Osaka Municipal Transportation Bureau

Intermodal transport authorities in Japan
Transport in Osaka